Ratnakar Hari Kelkar (22 June 1901 in Alibag – 14 November 1985 in New Delhi) was a revisor and translator of the Bible into Marathi.

Life
R. H. Kelkar was born into a Christian family; his father Hari Govind Kelkar had accepted Christianity in 1881. After his father's death in 1904, Kelkar had a difficult childhood. He studied in John Elphinstone School in Alibag but could not complete his education. He later moved to Bombay (now Mumbai) and after doing small jobs he got employment in a branch of the Bombay Post Office as a clerk. While working at the Post Office he continued his studies and received the BA degree of the University of Bombay in 1926. He worked in the Indian Postal Department for 34 years and retired in 1956 as the Deputy Presidency Post Master of Bombay GPO. While working in the Postal Service, he also studied accountancy and law, and cultivated a keen interest in religion, culture, history, language, and literature. After his retirement he served as the editor of the Marathi magazine Dnyanodaya from 1956 to 1963, and as a Professor of Marathi at the United Theological College, Pune until 1973. He died on 14 November 1985 at New Delhi, India.

Translation work
The first Marathi translation of the Holy Bible had been published in the early years of the 19th century by William Carey and his associates at Serampore in West Bengal, India. Later translations and revisions were mostly carried out by committees appointed by the Bible Society in India from time to time. There were two individual attempts to translate the Bible into Marathi – the New Testament by B N Athavale (1931) and the complete Bible by Pandita Ramabai (1922). The latest translation of the Marathi New Testament from Greek to Marathi was done by Ratnakar Hari Kelkar between 1968 and 1985. This work, Nava Karar, was published at bible-marathi.com in 2005. 

Translation work done by committees usually entails the use of complex phraseology to find common ground among differing doctrinal viewpoints, and a possible lack of consistency of expression in different parts of the text. R H Kelkar adopted a different approach. He did not use the same Marathi word everywhere for a particular Greek word in order to achieve fidelity of translation. Instead, he studied in great detail the meaning and background of New Testament Greek words, and prepared a wordbook that gave a few carefully chosen Marathi equivalents expressing different nuances of these Greek words. He then built up his Marathi translation by framing sentences using the most appropriate words and phrases. This approach has made his translation extremely readable in contemporary Marathi without loss of authenticity.

References

External links
 Excerpts of selected topics from the Marathi New Testament translated by R H Kelkar http://marathibible.wordpress.com

Translators of the Bible into Marathi
1904 births
1985 deaths
20th-century translators